Austroargiolestes amabilis is a species of Australian damselfly in the family Megapodagrionidae,
commonly known as a flame flatwing. 
It is endemic to eastern Australia, where it inhabits streams in rainforest.

Austroargiolestes amabilis is a medium-sized to large, black and bright yellow-orange damselfly, without pruinescence.
Like other members of the family Megapodagrionidae, it rests with its wings outspread.

Gallery

See also
 List of Odonata species of Australia

References 

Megapodagrionidae
Odonata of Australia
Insects of Australia
Endemic fauna of Australia
Taxa named by Friedrich Förster
Insects described in 1899
Damselflies